The 1974 South Pacific Touring Car Series was an Australian motor racing competition for Group C Touring Cars.
It was contested over four rounds, each staged as a support race to an Australian round of the 1974 International Tasman Championship.
The series, which was the fourth South Pacific Touring Series, was won by Peter Brock and his entrant, the Holden Dealer Team.

Round schedule 
The series was contested over four rounds.

Classes 
Cars competed in four engine displacement classes:
 Up to 1300cc
 1301 to 20000cc
 2001 to 30000cc
 Over 3000cc

Points system 
Points were awarded on a 4-3-2-1 basis to the top four outright placegetters in each round and on a 9-6-4-3-2-1 basis to the top six placegetters in each class in each round.
Points were only awarded conditional on the driver competing in the same make and model of car entered by the same entrant in all four rounds.

Series results 

Note: The series winner was considered to be the driver and his entrant.

References 

South Pacific Touring Series
South Pacific Touring Series